Roald is a Norwegian given name. It is the modern form of the Old Norse name Hróðvaldr or Hróaldr, composed of the elements hróðr "fame" and valdr "ruler, leader". Persons named Roald include:
Roald Aas (1928–2012), Norwegian Olympic speed skater and bicycle racer
Roald Als (born 1948), Danish political cartoonist
Roald Amundsen (1872–1928), Norwegian polar explorer
Roald Amundsen (footballer) (1913–1985), Norwegian professional footballer
Roald Åsmund Bye (1928–2003), Norwegian politician
Roald Bradstock (born 1962), English Olympic javelin thrower
Roald Dahl (1916–1990), British author and poet
Roald Dysthe (1903–1997), Norwegian businessman and acquitted Nazi collaborator
Roald G. Bergsaker (born 1942), Norwegian sports official and politician
Roald H. Fryxell (1934–1974), American geologist and archaeologist
Roald Halvorsen (1914–2010), Norwegian typographer, Communist Party politician, and World War II resistance member
Roald Hoffmann (born 1937), American theoretical chemist
Roald Jensen (1943–1987), Norwegian professional footballer
Roald Larsen (1898–1959), Norwegian Olympic speed skater
Roald (Løgmaður) (fl. 1450), First Minister of the Faroe Islands
Roald Øyen (born 1940), Norwegian television personality and host
Roald Poulsen (born 1950), Danish football manager
Roald Sagdeev (born 1932), Russian physicist
Roald Storsletten (1915–1991), Norwegian journalist and newspaper editor
Roald van Hout (born 1988), Netherlands professional footballer
Roald van Noort (born 1960), Netherlands Olympic water polo player
 Roald, A fictional penguin villager from the video game series Animal Crossing
Surname
Arnfinn Severin Roald (1914–1983), Norwegian politician

Norwegian masculine given names